Do the Right Thing was a comedy panel show podcast featuring host Danielle Ward, and team captains Michael Legge and Margaret Cabourn-Smith. The show was produced by Ben Walker. The show consisted of seven series and four specials. The final episode was the 2019 Christmas special. Danielle Ward confirmed that the show would not be returning after the Covid-19 Pandemic, as she had retired from live performance.

Format
Two teams of two comedians compete to "do the right thing in any situation". Each show comprises four rounds:
The Importance of Being Right
Agony
Ask the Expert
Do the Wrong Thing

Other media
A TV pilot episode, hosted by Claudia Winkleman, was recorded by Channel 4 in 2016.

Awards
Bronze, Best Internet Programme, Sony Radio Academy Awards, 2012.

References

External links
 

Audio podcasts
Comedy and humor podcasts
2011 podcast debuts

British podcasts